[[File:Airdrie & Coatbridge Advertiser, 3 April 1858.png|thumb|The Airdrie & Coatbridge Advertisers 3 April 1958 issue]]
The Airdrie & Coatbridge Advertiser''' is a tabloid newspaper published by Scottish and Universal Newspapers, a division of Reach plc, in Airdrie and Coatbridge, North Lanarkshire. The Airdrie & Coatbridge Advertiser'' is a weekly newspaper, printed every Wednesday, the newspaper printed in Blantyre.

The paper dates from 1855.

References

External links 
 Airdrie and Coatbridge Advertiser Website

Newspapers published in Scotland
Organisations based in North Lanarkshire
Airdrie, North Lanarkshire
Coatbridge
Newspapers published by Reach plc
1855 establishments in Scotland